Atmeyan-e Sofla (also Romanized as Ātmeyān-e Soflá; also known as Ātmeyān-e Pā'īn) is a village in Alan Baraghush Rural District, Mehraban District, Sarab County, East Azerbaijan Province, Iran. At the 2006 census, its population was 53, in 11 families.

References 

Populated places in Sarab County